The Library of Catalonia is the Catalan national library, located in Barcelona, Catalonia, Spain. The primary mission of the Library of Catalonia is to collect, preserve, and spread Catalan bibliographic production and that related to the Catalan linguistic area, to look after its conservation, and to spread its bibliographic heritage while maintaining the status of a center for research and consultation.

The Library occupies 8,820 m² and has nearly about four million items. It is a special member of the Consortium of European Research Libraries (CERL).

History
The library was founded in 1907, as the library of the Institute for Catalan Studies (Institut d'Estudis Catalans, IEC). It was opened to the public on 28 May 1914, in the time of the recently founded Commonwealth of Catalonia, and was housed in the Palau de la Generalitat de Catalunya.

In 1914, the Commonwealth of Catalonia converted the library of the IEC into a public cultural service. In its early days, the Library was situated in an area of the Palau de la Generalitat in Barcelona. In 1929, the Library was acquired by the city government of Barcelona. In 1931, the 15th century buildings formerly occupied by the (Old) Hospital de la Santa Creu were declared a part of Spain's historical patrimony; and the municipality of Barcelona approved the cession of large portion of the site to the Biblioteca de Catalunya.

During the Republic era (1931-1939), the process of relocation began. In 1934, the Generalitat confirmed its status of general institution with full legal personality by the Law of the Service of Libraries. In 1936, the first reading room of the new seat, the Sala Cervantina, was opened, but the project was halted because of the Spanish Civil War (1936-1939) and not all of the necessary adaptations were completed. After the fall of Barcelona in January 1939, the library was closed until 1940. After the Spanish Civil War, in 1940, the Library was reopened under the new name of Biblioteca Central ("Central Library") by Francoist dictatorship and moved to its new site, where it remains to this day. In Francoist Spain, the institution was turned into a general use library, which was intended to supplement the deficiencies of the public and university libraries.

In 1981, two years after the restoration of Catalan self-government, it was made the national library of Catalonia by the Llei de biblioteques ("Libraries law"), approved by the Parliament of Catalonia, conferring upon it the duties of the reception, conservation, and distribution of the Catalan legal deposit. In 1993, the Law of the Library System of Catalonia extended the institution's depository functions and helped in its modernization, which included the remodelling of the building, its reorganization and the digitization of its procedures.

During the 1990s, a major renovation project further transformed the Library, including the construction of four underground levels of storage (creating more than 40 kilometres of shelf-space) and the annex building. In 1998, the Library renovated the Gothic elements of its buildings and extended its space, thanks to the construction of a new services building.

Partnership with Google
In 2007, the Biblioteca de Catalunya and four more Catalan libraries agreed to join the digitization project. These libraries have begun digitizing books of theirs that are in the public domain. The digitization partnership project is intended to make these books available on the Internet. The Biblioteca de Catalunya acts as coordinator and intermediary on behalf of the other four Catalan libraries participating in the project: 
the library of the Monastery of Montserrat,
the Public Episcopal Library of the Seminary of Barcelona,
the Library of the Barcelona Excursionist Centre and
the Library of the Barcelona Athenaeum.
The Catalan libraries group became the second non-Anglo-Saxon collaborator to join the Google Books Library Project, within the Google Book Search program. In 1977, the Library of Catalonia joined another Spanish participant in the project, the Complutense University of Madrid.

Statistics
 Linear metres of shelving:
 Free access: 1,500 m (20,000 volumes)
 Closed stacks: 49,000 m
 Total surface area of the Biblioteca: 15,000 m2
 Total surface area of the General reading room: 2,700 m2
 Surface area of the Reserve room: 360 m2
 Seats (reading points): 229
 Total documents: 3 million (estimated)

See also
 List of libraries in Spain
 Google Book Search
 Google Books Library Project
 PADICAT
 Joan Maragall Archive
 Name and Title Authority File of Catalonia
 Llista d'encapçalaments de matèria en català

References

 Riding, Alan. "France Detects a Cultural Threat in Google," New York Times. 11 April 2005.

Further reading 

Fontbona, Francesc: Présentation dés tresors de la Unitat Gràfica de la Biblioteca de Catalunya, Barcelona, 2005.
Jorba, Manuel: La Biblioteca de Catalunya com a biblioteca nacional, Barcelona, 1996; The Biblioteca de Catalunya library of Catalonia, Barcelona, 1993 ; Els 80 anys de la Biblioteca de Catalunya, Barcelona, 1994.
Panyella, V.: The Biblioteca de Catalunya, Library of Catalonia, Barcelona: Biblioteca de Catalunya, 1993.
[Pere Bohigas (ed.)]: Cincuenta años de la antigua Biblioteca de Catalunya, Biblioteca Central de la Diputación de Barcelona, Barcelona 1968.
Reis Fontanals, Marga Losantos: Biblioteca de Catalunya, 100 anys : 1907–2007, Biblioteca de Catalunya, Barcelona 2007
Rodón, Joan: Sales de lectura de la Biblioteca de Catalunya, 1995.
Rodríguez Parada, Concepción: Los fondos patrimoniales de la Biblioteca de Catalunya, Firenze, 2010.

External links 

 Official website
 The European Library

1907 establishments in Catalonia
Organizations established in 1907
Catalonia
Libraries in Barcelona
Libraries established in 1907
Buildings and structures in Barcelona
Tourist attractions in Barcelona
Education in Barcelona
Deposit libraries
Catalonia
Barcelona